Chieti–Madonna delle Piane is a railway station in Chieti, Italy. The station opened on 30 March 2016 and is located on the Rome–Sulmona–Pescara railway. The train services are operated by Trenitalia.

Train services
The station is served by the following service(s):

Regional services (Treno regionale) Pescara- Chieti - Sulmona - Avezzano - Tivoli - Rome
Regional services (Treno regionale) Teramo - Giulianova - Pescara - Chieti - Sulmona - Avezzano

References

Railway stations in Abruzzo
Buildings and structures in the Province of Chieti
Chieti
Railway stations opened in 2016